Cornelius "Neil" W. Kelleher (May 9, 1923 – September 4, 2008) was an American politician from New York.

Life

Kelleher was born on May 9, 1923, in Troy, Rensselaer County, New York, the son of Cornelius J. Kelleher and Helen Fleming Kelleher. He attended St. Augustine's School and Lansingburgh High School. During World War II he served in the U.S. Navy fighting in the Pacific theater. He entered politics as a Republican. In 1957, he was appointed to fill a vacancy as alderman of Troy (17th Ward), and in 1960 he was elected Mayor of Troy.

He was a member of the New York State Assembly from 1967 to 1992, sitting in the 177th, 178th, 179th, 180th, 181st, 182nd, 183rd, 184th, 185th, 186th, 187th, 188th and 189th New York State Legislatures.

He was a member of the New York State Board of Elections from 1998 to 2008.

He died on September 4, 2008, in St. Mary's Hospital in Troy, New York; and was buried at the Gerald B. H. Solomon Saratoga National Cemetery, in Schuylerville.

His son, Neil J. Kelleher, was elected to the Rensselaer County Legislature in 1989, subsequently serving in that body for 20 years. In 1995 he became Chairman of the Legislature, and would serve in that capacity until losing his re-election bid in 2009.

References

External links
 

1923 births
2008 deaths
Politicians from Troy, New York
Mayors of places in New York (state)
Republican Party members of the New York State Assembly
United States Navy sailors
United States Navy personnel of World War II
Burials at Gerald B. H. Solomon Saratoga National Cemetery
20th-century American politicians